Sweta is a genus of leafhopper in the subfamily Typhlocybinae, with two species. The genus name is derived from the Sanskrit word for white, the type species  being predominantly whitish. The genus has an elongate pronotum which is unusual in Typhlocybinae and seen only in the Signoretiinae. A second species  was described from China in 2012.

References

Cicadellidae genera
Hemiptera of Asia
Dikraneurini